Georgy Vadimovich Koshlakov (8 February 1936 – 7 July 2017) was the deputy Prime Minister of Tajikistan. On January 23, 1989, the Gissar earthquake occurred. He is quoted as saying: "The earthquake caused a burst of mud from the foothills which poured down on the villages. It was up to five miles wide and one-and-a-half miles long." He was a head of the Department of Economics and Management at the Russian-Tajik Slavonic University.

References

1936 births
2017 deaths
Politicians from Yekaterinburg
Government ministers of Tajikistan

Recipients of the Order of Friendship of Peoples
Recipients of the Order of the Red Banner of Labour
Soviet geologists
Tajikistani geologists